Kauri Point is a rural settlement in the Western Bay of Plenty District and Bay of Plenty Region of New Zealand's North Island. It is on a headland on the eastern side of Tauranga Harbour, opposite Matakana Island.

A coastal walkway through Kauri Point Historic Reserve connects Kauri Point to Ongare Point. There are mature pōhutakawa trees and three pā sites in the reserve. A 200 metre long wooden jetty, built after 1947, provides fishing access to the harbour.

Dorothy Morris was a pioneer of the kiwifruit industry in New Zealand who she converted her dairy farm on Kauri Point Road to kiwifruit in the 1950s.

George Vesey Stewart, who organised settlement of Katikati in the 1870s, initially planned for the town to be established at Kauri Point. The settlement at Kauri Point did not eventuate until the 1970s.

Demographics
Ōngare Point-Kauri Point is defined by Statistics New Zealand as a rural settlement. It is part of the wider Tahawai statistical area.

Kauri Point had a population of 177 at the 2018 New Zealand census, an increase of 6 people (3.5%) since the 2013 census, and a decrease of 12 people (−6.3%) since the 2006 census. There were 75 households, comprising 84 males and 90 females, giving a sex ratio of 0.93 males per female. The median age was 54.2 years (compared with 37.4 years nationally), with 33 people (18.6%) aged under 15 years, 15 (8.5%) aged 15 to 29, 78 (44.1%) aged 30 to 64, and 51 (28.8%) aged 65 or older.

Ethnicities were 89.8% European/Pākehā, 13.6% Māori, 3.4% Asian, and 5.1% other ethnicities. People may identify with more than one ethnicity.

Although some people chose not to answer the census's question about religious affiliation, 54.2% had no religion, 27.1% were Christian, and 1.7% had Māori religious beliefs.

Of those at least 15 years old, 21 (14.6%) people had a bachelor's or higher degree, and 36 (25.0%) people had no formal qualifications. The median income was $24,900, compared with $31,800 nationally. 21 people (14.6%) earned over $70,000 compared to 17.2% nationally. The employment status of those at least 15 was that 57 (39.6%) people were employed full-time, 24 (16.7%) were part-time, and 6 (4.2%) were unemployed.

References

Western Bay of Plenty District
Populated places in the Bay of Plenty Region
Populated places around the Tauranga Harbour